Meskiana  is a town and commune in Oum El Bouaghi Province, Algeria near the Tunisian border. According to the 1998 census it has a population of 25,849.  It was the birthplace of novelist Yamina Méchakra.

References

Communes of Oum El Bouaghi Province